Rolling Thunder Revue: A Bob Dylan Story by Martin Scorsese (or Conjuring the Rolling Thunder Re-vue: A Bob Dylan Story by Martin Scorsese, according to the main title graphic) is a 2019 American pseudo-documentary film, composed of both fictional and non-fictional material, covering Bob Dylan's 1975 Rolling Thunder Revue concert tour. Directed by Martin Scorsese, it is the director's second film on Bob Dylan, following 2005's No Direction Home. The bulk of Rolling Thunder Revue is compiled of outtakes from Dylan's 1978 film Renaldo and Clara, which was filmed in conjunction with the tour.

The documentary features contemporary interviews with prominent figures of the tour such as Dylan, Joan Baez, Sam Shepard, Ronee Blakley, Ramblin' Jack Elliott, Roger McGuinn, Ronnie Hawkins, Larry Sloman, Rubin "Hurricane" Carter, as well as archival interviews with Scarlet Rivera and Allen Ginsberg. It also features fictional interviews of actors portraying characters who were not actually involved in the tour, including Martin Von Haselberg portraying the fictional filmmaker Stefan Van Dorp, Sharon Stone playing a fictionalized version of herself, and Michael Murphy reprising his role as Jack Tanner from the 1988 miniseries Tanner '88. Rolling Thunder Revue does not differentiate between the fictional and factual accounts, and even Dylan himself refers to the fictional characters in his interviews, leaving the audience to guess which parts of the film are authentic and which are fabricated.

Plot
The film opens with a modern-day Dylan admitting he does not remember anything about the Rolling Thunder Revue, saying it happened so long ago "I wasn't even born!" He finds it impossible to get to the "core" of what it was all about because "it's about nothing."

As the bicentennial of the country fast approaches, and with the spirit of America particularly bleak after the country's unceremonious exit from Vietnam and the Watergate scandal, Bob Dylan decides to gather together a group of his friends from the Greenwich Village coffee houses and go on an adventurous tour across New England and parts of Canada. Dubbed the "Rolling Thunder Revue", the tour is documented by European filmmaker Stefan Van Dorp who seeks to expose the hedonistic attitude of the people surrounding Dylan and juxtapose it against the nihilistic mood of middle-class America.

Along the way, Larry 'Ratso' Sloman, a reporter sent by Rolling Stone to write about the tour, tries to ingratiate himself into Dylan's inner circle. A young Sharon Stone is put in charge of costumes after being taken to a show by her mother and becomes convinced the song "Just Like a Woman" was written for her. Dylan starts to wear Whiteface makeup onstage after violinist Scarlet Rivera takes him to see a Kiss concert. Allen Ginsberg tries to refashion himself as a singer/songwriter as the beat poet movement starts falling out of popular relevance. Joan Baez attempts to rekindle her romance with Dylan by singing with him onstage and dressing up in his stage outfit; Dylan visits a Tuscarora Reservation in New York and performs a rendition of "The Ballad of Ira Hayes"; Joni Mitchell joins the tour midway thru and is inspired to write the song "Coyote" about the experience.

During the tour, we also glimpse Dylan's humanitarian side when he takes time to pay an unscheduled visit to record company executives to ensure rapid release of his new song "Hurricane", the musician's contribution to efforts to exonerate Ruben "Hurricane" Carter, a celebrated boxer wrongfully convicted of murder. 
Documentary footage of the meeting is followed by a scene in which actor Michael Murphy, in his signature role as U.S. representative Jack Tanner (in the Robert Altman film "Tanner 88"), delivers a tall tale that credits the fictional Tanner with persuading President Jimmie Carter to intervene on the boxer's behalf. Despite this fictional interlude, as "Rolling Thunder Re-vue" shows, the campaign by Dylan and others would eventually lead to 
the retrial and release of Rubin Carter.

The tour comes to a stop in Montreal. Van Dorp states the only reason he agreed to be interviewed for this documentary was to stake his claim over the footage from the tour which makes up the bulk of the film. Ginsberg encourages the viewer to follow the example of the performers they've witnessed and go on their own journeys of self-discovery. Bob Dylan continues to tour after the Rolling Thunder Revue, playing over 3,000 shows over the course of 40 years.

Cast
The interviewees in the film are given character names in the end credits. Some of the people interviewed were part of the Rolling Thunder Revue, some were not, and some are entirely fictional.

Production 
The project came from Dylan's manager, Jeff Rosen, who approached Scorsese with some of the tour's footage shortly after the completion of No Direction Home. The director instantly agreed to do it but was busy with other films at the time. The bulk of the work was done while he was finishing Silence. Once again, Rosen took charge of the interviews and gave them to Scorsese.

Release
The film was released by Netflix on June 12, 2019. Columbia Records also released a box-set album entitled Bob Dylan – The Rolling Thunder Revue: The 1975 Live Recordings to correspond with the release.

Home media 
Rolling Thunder Review: A Bob Dylan Story by Martin Scorsese received director-approved special edition DVD and Blu-ray releases by The Criterion Collection on January 19, 2021.

Critical response 
Manohla Dargis of The New York Times says Rolling Thunder Revue: A Bob Dylan Story by Martin Scorsese is “at once a celebration and a rescue mission (it draws heavily on restored film footage), as well as another chapter in Scorsese’s decades-long chronicling of Dylan.” It was also picked as one of the "Best Films of 2019 (so far)", by The New York Times.

The film received an aggregate score of 86 on critical website Metacritic, indicating "universal acclaim". The film has a 93% freshness rating at Rotten Tomatoes as of February 2022.

See also
The Bootleg Series Vol. 5: Bob Dylan Live 1975, The Rolling Thunder Revue (2002)

References

External links
 
Rolling Thunder Revue: American Multitudes an essay by Dana Spiotta at the Criterion Collection

2019 films
2019 documentary films
American mockumentary films
Concert films
Films about Bob Dylan
Films directed by Martin Scorsese
Films set in 1975
Netflix original documentary films
Rockumentaries
2010s English-language films
2010s American films